Lucas Victor Schaefels or Lucas Schaefels (Antwerp, 5 April 1824 – Antwerp, 17 September 1885) was a Belgian painter, draughtsman and engraver known for his still lifes, which for the most part were flower and hunting pieces.  He worked in a meticulous style reminiscent of the 17th century Flemish Baroque.

Life
Lucas Victor Schaefels trained with his father Hendrik Raphael Schaefels, a decorative painter working in a Neo-Classical style and a teacher of decorative design at the Antwerp Academy.  His younger brother Hendrik Frans “Rik” Schaefels (1827-1904) became a successful painter and draughtsman who specialized in naval battles, seascapes and Antwerp genre scenes.

Lucas Victor Schaefels began as a student of the Antwerp Academy and later became himself a professor of ornamental design at the Academy, replacing his father in that position.

Lucas Victor Schaefels' decorative style and strong sense of design earned him a commission to paint the chapels in a few churches in Antwerp. He acted as the unofficial town festival designer by designing and organising the public decorations for the many special occasions that took place in Antwerp, which at the time was a center of flower growing, competitions, and shows, as well as of art competitions and exhibitions.

Lucas Victor Schaefels taught many of the next generation of still life painters in Antwerp, including Frans Mortelmans, Joseph Van de Roye and Jules Schaumburg.

Work

Lucas Victor Schaefels was the foremost floral and still life painter of his generation in Antwerp. His style goes back to the Flemish Baroque of the 17th century and appears not to have been influenced by contemporary art movements.  His works feature elaborate and opulent interiors with a wealth of game, produce and flowers arranged in a traditional pyramid-shaped composition.

He also produced engravings for frontispieces.

Students 
Emile Mahieu (1861-1955)

Frans Mortelmans (1865-1936)

Joseph Van de Roye (1861-1941)

Jules Schaumburg (1839-1886)

References

External links

Belgian still life painters
Belgian printmakers
Artists from Antwerp
19th-century Belgian painters
19th-century Belgian male artists
1824 births
1885 deaths